Album Number Two is the second studio album from country music duo Joey + Rory. The album was released to the public on September 14, 2010, via Vanguard Records and Sugar Hill Records. Its lead single, "This Song's for You," was released to country radio on July 20, 2010. However, the single failed to enter the Hot Country Songs chart. The album's second single "That's Important to Me" was released to country radio in October 2010, and debuted at number 58 on the chart week ending February 12, 2011.

Track listing
"Album Number Two" (Rory Lee Feek, Don Poythress, Wynn Varble) – 2:57
"That's Important to Me" (R.L. Feek, Tim Johnson, Joey Feek) – 3:22
"All You Need Is Me" (R.L. Feek) – 2:53
"Born to Be Your Woman" (R.L. Feek, J. Feek, Heidi Feek) – 3:17
"Baby I'll Come Back to You" (R.L. Feek, Matt Rossi, David Banning) – 2:53
"God Help My Man" (R.L. Feek, Jamie Teachenor, Paul Overstreet) – 3:23
"The Horse Nobody Could Ride" (R.L. Feek, Banning) – 2:54
"Farm to Fame" (R.L. Feek, Jim Collins) – 3:21
"Where Jesus Is" (Poythress, LeAnn Hart, Donnie Skaggs) – 4:06
"You Ain't Right" (Phil O'Donnell, Kelley Lovelace, Tim Owens) – 3:33
"My Ol' Man" (R.L. Feek, Luke Bryan) – 3:53
"This Song's for You" (R.L. Feek, Zac Brown) – 3:56
featuring Zac Brown Band

Personnel 

 Bryan Allen – photography
 Jeff Balding – mixing
 Kathy Best – publicity
 Zac Brown – lead vocals on "This Song's for You"
 John Caldwell – engineer
 Jason Campbell – production coordination
 Clay Cook – steel guitar, background vocals, and Hammond B-3 organ on "This Song's for You"
 Tony Creasman – drums
 Heidi Feek – background vocals
 Joey Feek – vocals
 Rory Feek – acoustic guitar, vocals
 Shannon Forrest – drums
 Kevin "Swine" Grantt – bass guitar
 Aubrey Haynie – fiddle
 John Driskell Hopkins – backing vocals on "This Song's for You"
 Rob Ickes – dobro
 Carl Jackson – acoustic guitar, banjo, mandolin, producer, background vocals
 Mike Johnson – acoustic guitar, steel guitar
 Tristan Brock Jones – assistant
 John Kelton – mixing
 Jason Lehning – engineer
 Paul Leim – drums
 Matt Maher – management
 Kyle Manner – assistant engineer
 Jimmy de Martini – fiddle on "This Song's for You"
 Catherine Marx – synthesizer, piano
 Brent Mason – electric guitar
 Michael Powers – promoter
 Garrett Rittenberry – design
 Matt Rovey – engineer
 Doug Sax – mastering
 Billy Sherrill – engineer
 Jimmie Lee Sloas – bass guitar
 Jennie Smythe – marketing
 Adam Steffey – mandolin
 Keith Stegall – producer
 Bryan Sutton – acoustic guitar, electric guitar
 Ilya Toshinsky – acoustic guitar
 Barry Waldrep – mandolin
 Hank Williams – mastering
 Jay Williams – booking
 Luke Wooten – mixing

Chart performance
Album
Album Number Two debuted at number 60 on the U.S. Billboard 200, as well as number 9 on the U.S. Billboard Top Country Albums and number 11 on U.S. Billboard Independent Albums charts, with sales of 6,986 in the first week. As of October 16, 2010, the album has sold 14,244 copies in the U.S.

Singles

References

Joey + Rory albums
Sugar Hill Records albums
Vanguard Records albums
2010 albums